Berkovići is a village and municipality located in southern Republika Srpska, an entity of Bosnia and Herzegovina. As of 2013, it has a population of 2,114 inhabitants.

This village was struck by a big earthquake on April 22, 2022 with a magnitude of 5,7 on the Richter scale.

Geography
The municipality is located in the westernmost part of East Herzegovina.

History
The municipality was created in 1995, after the Bosnian War, out of the Republika Srpska-controlled portions of the pre-war municipality of Stolac (now in Federation of B&H).

Settlements
Aside from the town of Berkovići, the municipality includes the following settlements:

 Bitunja
 Brštanik
 Dabrica
 Hatelji
 Ljubljenica
 Ljuti Do
 Meča
 Predolje
 Poplat
 Strupići
 Selišta
 Suzina
 Šćepan Krst
 Trusina
 Žegulja

Berkovići also contains parts of the following settlements:

 Barane
 Burmazi
 Do
 Hodovo 
 Hrgud

Demographics

Population

Ethnic composition

Economy
The municipality is underdeveloped and much of the economic activity is agricultural.

See also
 Municipalities of Republika Srpska

References

External links

 
Villages in Republika Srpska
Populated places in Berkovići